"Drug paraphernalia" is a term to denote any equipment, product or accessory that is intended or modified for making, using or concealing drugs, typically for recreational purposes. Drugs such as marijuana, cocaine, heroin, fentanyl, and methamphetamine are related to a wide range of paraphernalia. Paraphernalia generally fall into two categories: user-specific products and dealer-specific products.

User-specific products include glass hashish pipes, crack cocaine pipes, smoking masks, hashish bongs, cocaine freebase kits, syringes, roach clips for holding the burning end of a marijuana joint.  Some stores sell items for growing hydroponic marijuana, such as guidebooks, fertilizer, and fluorescent grow-lights.  The term "paraphernalia" also refers to items such as hollowed-out cosmetic cases or fake pagers when used to conceal illegal drugs, or products purported to cleanse an individual's system of drug residues to increase the chance of passing a urine analysis drug test.

Dealer-specific products are used by drug sellers or traffickers for preparing drugs for distribution.  Items such as digital scales, vials, and small zipper storage bags that can be used to package crack, heroin, or marijuana fall into this category.

Legality

United States
In the US, enterprising individuals would sell items openly in the street, until anti-paraphernalia laws in the 1980s eventually ended the practice. With the growth of the Internet, drug paraphernalia sellers have greatly expanded their sales to a worldwide market.

According to the Federal Drug Paraphernalia Statute, 21 USC 863, which is part of the Controlled Substances Act, in the US it is illegal to sell, transport through the mail, transport across state lines, import, or export drug paraphernalia as defined. Possession is usually illegal under State law. The law gives specific guidance on determining what constitutes drug paraphernalia. Many states have also enacted their own laws prohibiting drug paraphernalia. In the 1982 case Hoffman Estates v. The Flipside, Hoffman Estates, Inc., the US Supreme Court found a municipal ordinance requiring licensing for paraphernalia sales to have sufficiently distinguished marketing for illegal use to be constitutional. Government crackdowns have resulted in the arrest of sellers of recreational drug paraphernalia, such as actor Maxwell Parker Hahn, who spent time in prison in 2003 for having his name used on bongs for sale via the internet.

The American drug paraphernalia laws can also apply to many items that have more legitimate uses than for illegal drugs. Small mirrors and other glass products (such as Pyrex test tubes and "glass crack pipes"), lighters, rolled up currency, razor blades, aluminum/tin foil, credit cards, and spoons have all been used to prosecute people under paraphernalia laws, whether or not they contain residue of illegal drugs. While United States federal statute defines paraphernalia with the concept of primary use, in practice this can be interpreted to be what the individual was currently primarily using the item for, allowing for common items to be treated as paraphernalia only in cases where more clear evidence allows such determination of primary use.

Head shops are very much alive and well in the US, however.  Generally, though, they have signs near presumable paraphernalia saying "For tobacco use only" or "Not for use with illicit drugs." Many also ban customers for referencing use of illegal drugs when buying items.  Similar policies are used in online head shops, where customers are often made to verify detailed disclaimers of their non-use of illegal substances before buying items.

United Kingdom
In the UK, while cannabis is illegal, owning drug paraphernalia is not illegal, but under the Misuse of Drugs Act 1971, the individual may be committing a criminal offense if the items contain traces of drugs.

Under Section 9A of the Misuse of Drugs Act 1971, It is a criminal offense "to supply or offer to supply an object for providing or preparing a controlled drug if a person believes that the article will be used in circumstances where the administration is unlawful. If convicted in a magistrates' court, the penalty is a maximum of six months in prison and/or a £5,000 fine.

See also 
 Drug checking
 Harm reduction
 One hitter (smoking)
 Philadelphia blunt ban
 Paraphernalia
 Recreational drug use

References

 
Cannabis culture
Cannabis smoking